Usnea scabrida is a foliose lichen that grows from holdfasts on trees. It occurs in southwest Western Australia. It is a very pale grayish-yellowish green, slender, pendant, branching from the base, unequally branching, and shrubby.  The cortex contains usnic acid, and the medulla contains scabrosins. The lichen was described as a new species in 1844 by English botanist Thomas Taylor.

Usnea scabrida is endemic to Western Australia, South Australia, New South Wales and Victoria, but is also found outside Australia, and in Queensland.  A subspecies Usnea scabrida subsp. elegans is found in eastern Australia.

References

External links
Usnea scabrida Taylor: Images and occurrence data from GBIF

scabrida
Lichen species
Lichens described in 1844
Lichens of Australia
Taxa named by Thomas Taylor (botanist)